Butylone, also known as β-keto-N-methylbenzodioxolylbutanamine (βk-MBDB), is an entactogen, psychedelic, and stimulant psychoactive drug of the phenethylamine chemical class. It is the β-keto (substituted cathinone) analogue of MBDB and the substituted methylenedioxyphenethylamine analogue of buphedrone.

History 

Butylone was first synthesized by Koeppe, Ludwig and Zeile which is mentioned in their 1967 paper. It remained an obscure product of academia until 2005 when it was sold as a designer drug. Butylone shares the same relationship to MBDB as methylone does to MDMA ("Ecstasy"). Formal research on this chemical was first conducted in 2009, when it was shown to be metabolised in a similar manner to related drugs like methylone.

Synthesis 
Butylone can be synthesized in a laboratory via the following route:
3,4-methylenedioxybutyrophenone dissolved in dichloromethane to bromine gives 3′,4′-methylenedioxy-2-bromobutyrophenone. This product was then dissolved in dichloromethane and added to an aqueous solution of methylamine (40%). HCl was then added. The aqueous layer was removed and made alkaline by using sodium bicarbonate. For the extraction of the amine ether was used. To get butylone a drop of ether and HCl solution was added.

Metabolism 
There are three major metabolic pathways of bk-MBDB as shown in the figure. As result of demethylenation followed by O-methylation bk-MBDB metabolises into 4-OH-3-MeO and 3-OH-4-MeO metabolites in human urine. The second pathway is a β-ketone reduction into β-ketone reduced metabolites. The third pathway is a N-dealkylation into N-dealkyl metabolites. The first two pathways occur more than pathway three. The most common metabolite is the 4-OH-3-MeO metabolite. The metabolites containing a hydroxyl-group would be excreted as their conjugates in urine.

Mechanism of action 
Butylone acts in a similar way as MDMA and Methylone, it causes an increase in extracellular monoamine levels.

The following tables lists the half maximal inhibitory and half maximal effective concentrations for norepinephrine, dopamine and serotonin receptors, respectively.

Drug prohibition laws

China
As of October 2015 Butylone is a controlled substance in China.

Sweden

United States
Butylone is also a Schedule I controlled substance under the Controlled Substances Act in the United States.

See also 
 MDPBP
 Pentylone
 Ephylone

References

External links 
 Erowid βk-MBDB Vault
 Erowid βk-MBDB Experience Vault

Psychedelic phenethylamines
Benzodioxoles
Cathinones
Designer drugs
Serotonin-norepinephrine-dopamine releasing agents
Entactogens and empathogens